The Jazz Book Club (JBC) was a publishing project of Sidgwick & Jackson, a London-based publisher.  Herbert Jones, the editor, and a distinguished panel, selected the works.  Sixty-six issues, and various extras were published from 1956 to 1967.

Publications 

Extra volumes

References 

Publishing companies of the United Kingdom
Defunct companies based in London